Sundin  is a Swedish surname. The Svensk root/origin/translation: “sund” is a strait (body of water) + “in” is a more modern form of the Swedish tradition of latinization of surnames, meaning “descendant of” An earlier form of Sundin might have been  “Sundius” or “Sundovius.”

Notable people with the surname include:

Andreas Sundin, professional Swedish ice hockey player 
Carl Sundin, Swedish sprint canoer
David Sundin, Swedish comedian and television presenter
Erik Sundin, Swedish football player
Fredrik Sundin  professional Swedish ice hockey player 
Drake Sundin, half of music production duo, Class Fools
Mats Sundin, Swedish professional ice hockey player
Michael Sundin (1961–1989), English television presenter, actor, dancer and trampolinist 
Niklas Sundin, Swedish guitarist of Dark Tranquillity
Robin Sundin, Swedish Bandy player 
Ronnie Sundin, retired Swedish professional ice hockey defenseman.

Swedish-language surnames